WildStar is a 2014 MMORPG developed by Carbine Studios.

Wildstar or WildStar may also refer to:
 WildStar (Image Comics), an Image Comics comic book series
 Wildstar (DC Comics), a fictional superheroine in comic books published by DC Comics
 Wildstar Records, a record label
 "Wildstar" (song), a song on the Giorgio Moroder album Déjà Vu
 Wild Star Yamaha XV1600A, motorcycle
 Derek Wildstar, a character from the animated feature Star Blazers

See also